Following is a list of Delta Delta Delta members organized by area of notability.

Arts

Beauty pageant contestants

Business and education

Education

Entertainment

Journalism and news

Law

Literature

Military and aviation

Politics and public service

Sports

See also 
List of Delta Delta Delta chapters

References 

Lists of members of United States student societies